Boss of the Soul-Stream Trombone is an album by American trombonist Curtis Fuller recorded in 1960 and released on the Warwick label. The album was re-released under Freddie Hubbard's name as Gettin' It Together.

Reception

Allmusic awarded the album 3 stars with its review by Scott Yanow stating, "this otherwise unremarkable set is sparked by the inclusion of the young trumpeter Freddie Hubbard (recently arrived from Indianapolis) and tenor saxophonist Yusef Lateef... Hubbard's fiery statements often steal the show".

Track listing
All compositions by Curtis Fuller except as indicated
 "Chantized" - 4:08    
 "Flutie" - 7:12    
 "If I Were a Bell" (Frank Loesser) - 9:13    
 "But Beautiful" (Johnny Burke, Jimmy Van Heusen) - 5:33    
 "Do I Love You?" (Cole Porter) - 5:57    
 "The Court" - 5:06    
 "Mr. L" - 5:02

Personnel
Curtis Fuller - trombone
Freddie Hubbard - trumpet
Yusef Lateef - tenor saxophone
Walter Bishop, Jr. - piano
Buddy Catlett - bass
Stu Martin - drums

References 

1961 albums
Curtis Fuller albums